Catopsis subulata is a species in the genus Catopsis. This species is native to Mexico (Chiapas, Oaxaca), Guatemala, and Honduras.

References

subulata
Flora of Mexico
Flora of Central America
Plants described in 1936